Christopher Isengwe (also Christopher Isegwe Njunguda; born February 22, 1976) is a Tanzanian long-distance athlete competing mainly in the marathon.

In August 2005 he won a silver medal at the 2005 World Championships in Athletics in Helsinki. His silver medal was the first medal for Tanzania at the World Championships in history.

Achievements
All results regarding marathon, unless stated otherwise

References

External links
 
Isegwe - A first for Tanzania (IAAF.org)
marathoninfo

1976 births
Living people
Tanzanian male marathon runners
World Athletics Championships medalists
World Athletics Championships athletes for Tanzania